Gliese 163 c or Gl 163 c is a potentially habitable exoplanet, orbiting within the habitable zone of M dwarf star Gliese 163. 

The parent star is 15.0 parsecs (approximately 49 light-years, or 465 trillion kilometers) from the Sun, in the constellation Dorado.  Gliese 163 c is one of five planets discovered in the system.  With a mass at least 7.2 times that of the Earth, it is classified as a super-Earth (a planet of roughly 1 to 10 Earth masses).

References

External links 
 The Extrasolar Planets Encyclopedia
 "The Habitable Exoplanets Catalog"(PHL/UPR Arecibo)

 

Gliese 163
Dorado (constellation)
Exoplanets discovered in 2012
Exoplanets detected by radial velocity
0163
Super-Earths in the habitable zone
1